Knight Ridge is an unincorporated community in Salt Creek Township, Monroe County, in the U.S. state of Indiana.

History
The name of the community honors the Knight family of settlers.

Geography

References

Unincorporated communities in Monroe County, Indiana
Unincorporated communities in Indiana
Bloomington metropolitan area, Indiana